Maublancia is a genus of fungi in the Microthyriaceae family.

The genus name of Maublancia is in honour of André Pierre Jules Maublanc (1880–1958), who was a French mycologist and plant pathologist.

The genus was circumscribed by Gabriel Arnaud in Ann. École Natl. Agric. Montpellier n.s. vol.16 on page 158 in 1918.

Species
As accepted by Species Fungorum;

 Maublancia gaultheriae 
 Maublancia indica 
 Maublancia juruana 
 Maublancia myrtacearum 
 Maublancia raripoda 
 Maublancia trichocladii 
 Maublancia uleana

References

External links
Index Fungorum

Microthyriales